Shamma is a feminine or masculine given name of Arabic origin meaning 'high place.'

The name is also used as an Arabic surname (or family name), mainly for those migrating from Makkah to the Syrian "Sham" countries.

The name is very popular in the United Arab Emirates.

Notes

Feminine given names